Fausto Zonaro (18 September 1854 – 19 July 1929) was an Italian painter, best known for his Realist style paintings of life and history of the Ottoman Empire.

Life

Young life and early art career

Fausto Zonaro was born in Masi, a municipality in the Province of Padua, then part of the Austrian Empire. He was the eldest child of the mason Maurizio and his wife Elisabetta Bertoncin. Maurizio intended that his son should also be a mason, yet at a young age, Fausto showed a great ability at drawing. With his parents’ consent, he enrolled first in the Technical Institute in Lendinara, then in the Cignaroli Academy in Verona under Napoleone Nani. Fausto opened a small art school and studio in Venice, but traveled often to Naples as well. He felt no clear direction in his life at that time.

He actively displayed works in exhibition and gained respect of critics. He painted mainly genre works in oil and watercolor. In 1883 at Milan, he exhibited: Le rivelatrici napoletane; Da Sant'Elmo, and Al Pincio; in Rome, the canvases Passa la vacca; La sofferente; Le cucitrici napoletane, and Il saponaro. In 1884, at Turin: Tempesta; Primo nato; Primo tuono, and the Zoccolaro of Naples; and in 1887 at Venice: In attesa; Al Redentoretto, and Lavoratrice di perle. La casa Camerini of Padua once possessed a banditore; and two canvases: I pigiatori and In medio stat virtus.

The turning point in Zonaro's career occurred however in 1891, when he fell in love with photographer Elisabetta Pante (1863-1946), a pupil of his in Venice, and together they traveled to Istanbul, capital of the Ottoman Empire, inspired in part by Edmondo de Amicis’ orientalist travel book Constantinopoli.

Constantinople

In 1892, Zonaro and Pante married, and lived in the Constantinople neighborhood of Pera.

Over time he gained patronage in Çonstantinople's aristocratic circles.  While teaching painting to the wife of Munir Pasha, the Minister of Protocol, Zonaro and Pante got to know the important artistic figures of Istanbul of that time, including Osman Hamdi Bey. In 1896 he was nominated as the court painter (Ottoman Turkish: Ressam-ı Hazret-i Şehriyari) to Abdulhamid II thanks to the intervention of the Russian ambassador who had introduced the sultan to Zonaro's work, Il reggimento imperiale di Ertugrul sul ponte di Galata (in English: The Imperial Regiment of Ertugrul on the Galata Bridge), which he then purchased.

The Sultan later commissioned a series of paintings depicting events in the life of the 15th-century Ottoman sultan, Mehmed II. As court painter, Zonaro viewed himself as the successor to the Venetian painter Gentile Bellini, who had been commissioned by Mehmed II to paint his portrait over 300 years earlier.

During his stay in Constantinople, Zonaro witnessed the Day of Ashura processions carried out by the Shia Muslims on the tenth of Muharram, and it was the procession of Tatbir that inspired him to paint his renowned painting 10th of Muharram. Zonaro is reported to have said "After witnessing the horrifying procession (of Tatbir), I wish I were able to meet this man they mourn for". The man Zonaro was referring to was the grandson of the Prophet Mohammed, Hussein ibn Ali.

Return to Italy
Zonaro remained in Istanbul until 1909, but after the Young Turk Revolution that overthrew his patron Abdulhamid II and the shift to constitutional monarchy he returned to Italy. There would be no further Ottoman court painters after him. He settled in Sanremo where, until his death, he continued to produce small paintings of the Italian Riviera and the nearby French Riviera, as well as nostalgic scenes of the Bosphorus to assuage his yearning for Istanbul.

In 1920 he separated from his wife and began living with his daughter. Nine years later, he died. He is buried in the Foce Cemetery in Sanremo. On his gravestone, beneath an Ottoman tughra, it states that Zonaro was the court painter of the Ottoman Empire.

Artistic work and reputation

A prolific artist who created hundreds of works, Zonaro painted portraits, landscapes and historical paintings, mostly of the Ottoman Empire. He is said to have been "one of those who made a major contribution to the development of western style art in Turkey.” An exhibition of his work in Florence in 1977 "received wide acclaim in the art world".

Today, most of Zonaro's works are displayed in Istanbul's leading museums, including in the Topkapı Palace, the Dolmabahçe Palace and the Istanbul Military Museum. Others of his works can be seen in the private Sakıp Sabancı Museum and Pera Museum. A number of his paintings belong to private collectors in Turkey.

Gallery

Some of Zonaro's paintings are in the Pera Museum in Istanbul (Daughter of the English Ambassador Riding in a Palanquin) and the Istanbul Museum of Modern Art.

See also

 List of Orientalist artists
 Orientalism

References

Sources
 Fausto Zonaro page :it:Fausto Zonaro on the Italian Wikipedia
 Fausto Zonaro page :tr:Fausto Zonaro on the Turkish Wikipedia (Vikipedi)
 Studies site Osmanlı Araştırmaları
  faustozonaro.it, site dedicated to the artist (in Italian).
 Constantinople City of the World’s Desire 1453-1924 by Philip Mansel
  Un pittore Veneto Bizantino, Cronache della civiltà elleno-Latina, Rivista Quindicinale, Volume 11, Fasc VII-VIII, (1903) author Angelo De Gubernatis, page 123–125.

External links

Site containing numerous paintings by the artist, accessed by clicking on the blue titles on the right
 Three Zonara paintings at Art Renewal Center.
 Another painting  at Art Renewal Center.

1854 births
1929 deaths
19th-century Italian painters
Italian male painters
20th-century Italian painters
20th-century male artists
Orientalism
Orientalist painters
Ottoman culture
Painters at the court of the Ottoman Empire
19th-century painters of historical subjects